India competed at the 1968 Winter Olympics in Grenoble, France.

Jeremy Bujakowski represented India in Alpine Skiing, competing in the Men's Downhill, Men's Slalom, and Men's Giant Slalom events.

Alpine skiing

Men

Men's slalom

References
Official Olympic Reports
Olympics-Reference.com

Nations at the 1968 Winter Olympics
1968